Burns Beach is a suburb of Perth, Western Australia, located  north of Perth's central business district at the northern fringe of the City of Joondalup. Burns Beach has maintained much of its original character as a small coastal village even with its loss of isolation, and the beach is popular among hang gliding enthusiasts.

History
The land at Burns Beach was originally owned by the Midland Railway Company. In 1908, following a request from 50 local residents, the Wanneroo Road Board (which eventually became City of Wanneroo) successfully applied for a  reserve for camping and a health resort. By the 1920s, the area was well used by locals, who knew the area as "Burns Beach" after a farmer who ran sheep in the area.

For many years it was accessible only by track or boat and functioned as a small coastal village, and tourism and fishing were the main occupations. After World War II, it was connected by road to Wanneroo Road.

The sprawl of housing development extending northwards from Perth reached Burns Beach in the early- to mid-1990s with the growth of Joondalup as a regional centre and the construction of the suburbs of Currambine and Kinross.

Present day
Burns Beach has maintained much of its original character even with its loss of isolation, and the original caravan park is still in operation. Burns Beach marks one end of a coastal nature walk extending to Fremantle. The suburb also contains a cafe and restaurant  with outdoor seating, as well as a picnic area with barbecues and toilets. Burn's Beach's ocean facing parking bays are a popular destination for residents seeking a pleasant spot to watch the sun set in the summer, or the waves pound through in winter.

Geography
Burns Beach is bounded by the ocean to the west, Marmion Avenue to the east and Burns Beach Road to the south. Tamala Park, a bushland buffer to the north, separates Burns Beach and Kinross from the Mindarie-Clarkson urban region.

At the 2001 census, Burns Beach had a population of 225 people living in 90 dwellings, with a median age of 39 years (among the oldest in the northern suburbs). A caravan park at the end of Ocean Parade (technically in Iluka) houses another 90 residents. Residential styles in Burns Beach include a mix of holiday dwellings from before and after World War II.

Education
A new Burns Beach primary School opened in February 2022. Other primary schools are at Beaumaris (Ocean Reef), Currambine and Kinross. Burns Beach falls within the Ocean Reef Senior High School and  Clarkson Community High School catchment areas.

Transport
Burns Beach is served by the 470 and 471 Transperth bus routes from Joondalup, which are operated by Swan Transit.

Politics
Burns Beach is a reasonably affluent suburb with a large elderly population. While this would normally point to a clear Liberal Party preference, fishermen and permanent residents of the caravan park who favour Labor comprise a fair proportion of those voting at Burns, making it a marginal booth with no clear preference at either federal or state elections. Nearby Kinross, an urban residential estate suburb similar to the proposed Burns Beach Estate, favours the Liberal Party although not as strongly as Currambine and Ocean Reef to the south.

See also
 Electoral district of Burns Beach

References

Suburbs of Perth, Western Australia
Suburbs in the City of Joondalup